In typography and computing, characters per line (CPL) or terminal width refers to the maximal number of monospaced characters that may appear on a single line. It is similar to line length in typesetting.

History 

The limit of the line length in 70–80 characters may well have originated from various technical limitations of various equipment. The American teletypewriters could type only 72 CPL, while the British ones even less, 70 CPL. In the era of typewriters, most designs of the typewriter carriage were limited to 80–90 CPL. Standard paper sizes, such as the international standard A4, also impose limitations on line length: using the US standard Letter paper size (8.5×11"), it is only possible to print a maximum of 85 or 102 characters (with the font size either 10 or 12 characters per inch) without margins on the typewriter.

In computer technology, a line of an IBM punched card consisted of 80 characters. Widespread computer terminals such as DEC's VT52 and VT100 mostly followed this standard, showing 80 CPL and 24 lines. This line length was carried over into the original 80×25 text mode of the IBM PC, along with its clones and successors. To this day, virtual terminals most often display 80×24 characters.

The "long" line of 132 CPL comes from mainframes' line printers. However, some printers or printing terminals could print as many as 216 CPL, given certain extra-wide paper sizes and/or extra-narrow font sizes.

In modern computing 
With the advent of desktop computing and publishing, and technologies such as TrueType used in word processing and web browsing, a uniform CPL has been made mostly obsolete. HTML (and some other modern text presentation formats) uses dynamic word wrapping which is more flexible than characters per line restriction and may produce a text block with non-rectangular shape, just like in paper typesetting.

Many plain text documents still conform to 72 CPL out of tradition (e.g.).

In programming 
Many  style guides for computer programming define the maximum or desirable number of characters in a line of source code:

See also 
 IBM 80-column punched card format
 Apple 80-Column Text Card
 Column (typography)
 Line length (the equivalent concept for non-monospaced text)

References 

Text user interface
Typography
Typesetting
Wikipedia articles with ASCII art